Epicephala albifrons is a moth of the family Gracillariidae. It is known from India (Karnataka, West Bengal and Kerala), Indonesia (Buru), Sri Lanka, Thailand and Vietnam.

The larvae feed on Phyllanthus species, including Phyllanthus niruri. They probably mine the leaves of their host plant.

References

Epicephala
Moths of Asia
Moths described in 1859